Nationality words link to articles with information on the nation's poetry or literature (for instance, Irish or France).

Events
 The Weimar Classicism period in Germany is commonly considered to have begun in 1788) and to have ended either in 1805, with the death of Schiller, or this year, with the death of Goethe
 Thomas Jefferson Hogg, a friend of Percy Bysshe Shelley, contributed to Bulwer-Lytton's New Monthly Magazine his "Reminiscences of Shelley", which was highly regarded. As a result, Hogg will later write a biography of Shelley.

Works published in English

United Kingdom
 W. E. Aytoun, Poland, Homer, and Other Poems
 Henry Glassford Bell, My Old Portfolio; or, Tales and Sketches
 William Lisle Bowles, St. John in Patmos
 John Donald Carrick, ed., Whistle Binkie, anthology of Scottish poetry
 Barry Cornwall, see Bryan Waller Proctor, below
 James Hogg, writing under the pen name "The Ettrick Shepherd", Altrive Tales
 Leigh Hunt, The Poetical Works of Leigh Hunt published by subscription
 Thomas Miller, Songs of the Sea Nymphs
 Bryan Waller Proctor, writing under the pen name "Barry Cornwall", English Songs
 Percy Bysshe Shelley, The Masque of Anarchy, posthumous, preface by Leigh Hunt
 Alfred Tennyson, Poems, including "The Lady of Shalott", "Mariana in the South", "Oenone", "The Palace of Art", "A Dream of Fair Women" and "The Lotos-Eaters"; published in December of this year, although the book states "1833" (see also Poems 1842)
 Letitia Elizabeth Landon, writing under the pen name "L.E.L." The Easter Gift
 Letitia Elizabeth Landon, writing under the pen name "L.E.L." Fisher's Drawing Room Scrap Book, 1833
 Robert Millhouse, The Destinies of Man.

United States
 William Cullen Bryant, Poems, has most of the author's significant work since 1818, with five previously unpublished poems, including "To a Fringed Gentian" and "The Song of Marion's Men"; described as "the best volume of American verse that has ever appeared" by a writer in The North American Review
 Thomas Holley Chivers, The Path of Sorrow; or, The Lament of Youth; the author's first book of poetry, written while he was studying medicine
 Sumner Lincoln Fairfield, The Last Night of Pompeii, a narrative poem about the conflicts between the Christian and pagan faiths; written in three cantos of blank verse
 William Gilmore Simms, Atalantis: A Story of the Sea, a poem about a sea-fairy saved from a demon by a Spanish knight, who is then led by her into the caves of the ocean
 Frederick William Thomas, The Emigrant, the author's first book; about the Ohio River region, influenced by William Wordsworth and Lord Byron

Works published in other languages
 Théophile Gautier, Albertus, 62 poems in a wide variety of verse forms, often imitating other, more established Romantic poets such as Sainte-Beuve, Alphonse de Lamartine, and Victor Hugo; an expanded version of Poésies 1830, which contained 40 pieces composed when the author was 18 years old (since that work was published during the July Revolution, no copies were sold and it was eventually withdrawn; see also the revised edition, 1845), includes "Albertus", written in 1831, a long narrative poem of 122 alexandrine stanzas parodying macabre and supernatural Romantic tales; France
 Johann Wolfgang von Goethe, Faust, part II, Germany
 Adam Mickiewicz, Dziady, part III, Poland
 Aleksandr Pushkin's Eugene Onegin, Russia
 Frederik Paludan-Muller Fire Romancer ("Four Romances"), his first book of poems, Denmark

Births
Death years link to the corresponding "[year] in poetry" article:
 January 27 – Lewis Carroll, pen name of Charles Lutwidge Dodgson (died 1898), English writer of nonsense prose and poetry
 March 17 – Joseph Skipsey (died 1903), English "pitman poet"
 May 13 – Juris Alunāns (died 1864), Latvian philologist and poet
 June 10 – Edwin Arnold (died 1904), English
 October 1 – Henry Clay Work (died 1884), American songwriter
 October 9 – Elizabeth Akers Allen (died 1911), American author, journalist and poet
 November 21 – Benjamin Paul Blood (died 1919), American philosopher and poet
 December 13 – Matsudaira Teru 松平照 also called "Teruhime" 照姫, literally translated, "Princess Teru" (died 1884), late Edo and early Meiji period Japanese aristocrat and  skilled waka poet who instructed Matsudaira Katamori in poetry and calligraphy

Deaths

Birth years link to the corresponding "[year] in poetry" article:

 February 3 – George Crabbe (born 1754), English
 March 22 – Johann Wolfgang von Goethe (born 1749), German novelist, dramatist and poet
 August 17 – James Bisset (born c. 1762), British artist, manufacturer, writer, collector, art dealer and poet
 September 21
 Anna Maria Porter (born 1780), English poet, novelist and sister of Jane Porter
 Sir Walter Scott (born 1771), Scottish poet and historical novelist
 December 17 – Robert Charles Sands (born 1799), American writer and poet
 December 18 – Philip Freneau (born 1752), American poet, nationalist, polemicist, sea captain and newspaper editor
 James Thomson (born 1763), Scottish weaver poet

See also
 Poetry
 List of years in poetry
 List of years in literature
 19th century in literature
 19th century in poetry

 Romantic poetry
 Golden Age of Russian Poetry (1800–1850)
 Young Germany (Junges Deutschland) a loose group of German writers from about 1830 to 1850
 List of poets

Notes

19th-century poetry
Poetry